In landscape architecture and garden design, a water feature is one or more items from a range of fountains, jeux d'eau, pools, ponds, rills, artificial waterfalls, and streams. Before the 18th century they were usually powered by gravity, though the famous Hanging Gardens of Babylon are described by Strabo as supplied by an Archimedean screw and other examples were supplied with water using hydraulic rams.

Ancient water features were powered using gravitational forces, human power or animals to pump in the water. Since the 18th century, the majority of water features have been powered by pumps. In the past, the power source was sometimes a steam engine, but in modern features it is almost always powered by electricity. There is an increasing range of innovative designs as the market becomes more established and people become more aware of alternate installation methods, such as solar power. The advantages of using solar power include environmental benefits, no electrical lines in the garden, and free energy.

Modern water features are typically self-contained, meaning that they do not require water to be plumbed in; rather water is recycled from either a pond or a hidden reservoir, also known as a sump. The sump can either be contained within the water feature, or buried underground (in the case of an outdoor water feature).

A water feature may be indoor or outdoor and can range in size from a desk top water fountain to a large indoor waterfall that covers an entire wall in a large building, and can be made from any number of materials, including stone, stainless steel, resin, iron and glass. Most water features are electronically controlled, ranging from simple timer actuators to sophisticated computerized controls for synchronizing music to water and light animation.

Water features often offer additional benefits to homeowners, such as increased curb appeal, home value, reduced noise pollution (due to the sound of water overpowering outside noise), increased humidity in dry regions and improved air quality.

History
In early modern Europe, fountains were found in the elaborate gardens of the mansions of the wealthy, and in modern times can be an element in urban design provided by the municipal authorities or public subscription.
Water features are often found in gardens of middle class houses.

A notable modern example is the Diana, Princess of Wales Memorial Fountain in London, England.

Types of water features 

 Categories
 Natural water feature
 Man-made water feature
 Naturalistic water feature
 Disappearing water feature
 Live water feature
 Sterile water feature
 Pools and ponds
 Fish pond
 Formal pool
 Garden pond
 Koi pond
 Lake
 Lotus pool
 Naturalistic pond
 Plunge pool
 Reflecting pool
 Shallow pool/tide pool
 Stream pool
 Swimming pond
 Swimming pool
 Wildlife pond/habitat pond
 Water courses
 Brooks
 Creeks
 Streams
 Rivers
 Runnel
 Rill
 Wild river
 Fountains
 Bubbler fountain
 Disappearing fountain
 Drinking fountain
 Floating fountain
 Formal fountain
 Jeux d'eau
 Kugel fountain
 Spitter fountain
 Tabletop fountain
 Wall fountain
 Water falls
 Artificial waterfall
 Chadar – a textured water ramp of Indian origin.
 Weeping wall
 Water wall
 Water stair
 Water ramp
 Cultivation
 Hydroponics
 Rice paddy
 Habitats
 Wildlife garden – with water-source component.
 Bogs
 Wetlands
 Mangrove swamp habitat
 Bog garden
 Rain garden/bio retention system/rain harvesting
 Aquatic container garden
 Riparian zone restoration
 Water sources
 Spring (hydrology)
 Seep (hydrology)

See also
Crystal Fountains
Hercules monument (Kassel) – water feature built in 1714 
Musical fountain
Rain chain
Water garden

References

External links

Water
Garden features